Halba is the capital of Akkar Governorate in northern Lebanon, close to the border with Syria. Its population is divided between Sunni Muslim, Greek Orthodox Christians, Maronites, and followers of other religions.

History
In 1838, Eli Smith noted  the village,  whose inhabitants were Greek Orthodox, located west of esh-Sheikh Mohammed.

In 1856 it was named Halba on Kiepert's map of Palestine/Lebanon published that year,

Halba is home to Sada Akkar Newspaper, the only privately owned news agency in Akkar District. Halba is also home to a Lebanese Red Cross First Aid Center. Today, it is majority Sunni Muslim.

References

Bibliography

External links
 Halba, Localiban 
Halba news section on Sada Akkar newspaper

Akkar District
Populated places in Akkar Governorate
Sunni Muslim communities in Lebanon
Eastern Orthodox Christian communities in Lebanon